Tuuri is a Finnish-language surname. Notable people with the surname include:

Antti Tuuri (born 1944), Finnish writer
Arthur L. Tuuri (1920–1996), American pediatrician
Helena Tuuri, Finnish diplomat
Joacim Tuuri (born 1989), Finnish footballer

Finnish-language surnames